Language-independent may refer to:
Language-independent specification, a programming language specification applicable toward arbitrary language bindings
Language independent arithmetic, a series of ISO/IEC standards on computer arithmetic
Language independent data types, a collection of datatypes defined independently of programming language

See also
Language-agnostic, development paradigm where an appropriate language is chosen for a particular task